KLNX-LP (107.9 FM) is a radio station licensed to Minturn, Colorado, United States.  The station is currently owned by Minturn Public Radio.

References

External links
 

LNX-LP
Radio stations established in 2006
2006 establishments in Colorado
LNX-LP